Braver Than We Are is the twelfth and final studio album by American singer Meat Loaf, released in Europe on September 9, 2016, by Caroline International S&D and released in the United States on September 16, 2016 by 429 Records.

It is the last album for both Meat Loaf and songwriter Jim Steinman before their respective deaths in January 2022 and April 2021.

Background 
Meat Loaf first announced that he had begun working with Jim Steinman again on The Jonathan Ross Show in April 2013. "We've been communicating back and forth for the last six months every day by email," he explained to Jonathan Ross. At this time, Steinman was only contributing two songs to the album, though Meat Loaf was hoping he would contribute a third song. "We've cut three tracks, we're getting ready to cut three more, and then we'll hopefully cut three with Steinman." He had planned to begin working with Steinman in January 2014, with an expected release of September later that year.

Ellen Foley and Karla DeVito were approached to record duets on the album. In September 2013, Meat Loaf told BroadwayWorld that he would—with Steinman's approval—like to record duets with Bonnie Tyler and Lorraine Crosby as well.

Ultimately, all the songs were written or co-written by Steinman. The record's producer, Paul Crook, commented that "although there's been Bat 1, Bat 2 and Bat 3 completed, I believe this is actually Bat 3. I'm gonna say that. I might get myself in trouble, but I'm gonna say that. Jim's involvement in this record is so intense. The songs, the way they run together and the narrative of the record, nothing has been this cohesive since Bat 1."

Content 
"Loving You's a Dirty Job" first appeared on Bonnie Tyler's 1986 album Secret Dreams and Forbidden Fire. The song "More" first appeared on The Sisters of Mercy's 1990 album Vision Thing. The album includes a reunion with vocalists Ellen Foley and Karla DeVito (vocalists from the studio and live versions of "Paradise by the Dashboard Light", respectively) on the song "Going All the Way". All songs can be traced back to earlier Jim Steinman projects such as his musicals The Dream Engine and Neverland of which also songs were used for early Meat Loaf albums.

A ‘Bonus Edition’ of the album, sold at various chains like Target, Tesco and Media Markt contained three exclusive bonus tracks. The same tracks were included in the Japanese edition.

Title 
The original title for the album was announced as Brave & Crazy, but was subsequently changed to Braver Than We Are, the title of a Jim Steinman composition which was rewritten and recorded for this album as "Going All the Way (A Song in 6 Movements)".

Release and promotion 
Amazon users who pre-ordered the digital release of Braver Than We Are could download "Souvenirs" and "Train of Love" immediately.  The majority of the album, minus "Skull of Your Country", was accidentally leaked on Apple Music on June 22, 2016, and was subsequently taken down after several hours.

Track listing

Personnel 
 Produced, mixed and engineered by Paul Crook
 Creative consultant - Jim Steinman
 Additional engineering - John Miceli, Pat Thrall, Steve Rinkoff
 Mastering Engineer - Maor Appelbaum

Arrangements
 Arranged by Jim Steinman, Meat Loaf & Paul Crook
 Horn arrangements: David Luther
 Backing vocal arrangements: Justin Avery

Band
 Meat Loaf - vocals

The Neverland Express
 Paul Crook - guitar, loops, synths
 Danny Miranda - bass guitar
 Randy Flowers - guitars, vocals
 Justin Avery - piano, synth, strings
 David Luther - saxophone, B3 organ, strings
 John Miceli - drums
 Stacy Michelle - featured vocals (3, 4)
 Cian Coey - featured vocals (9)

Guest performers
 Ellen Foley - featured vocals (2)
 Karla DeVito - featured vocals (2)
 Rickey Medlocke - slide guitar solo (10)

Studio musicians
 Alicia Avery - backing vocals

Charts

References 

2016 albums
Meat Loaf albums
Caroline Records albums
429 Records albums